Krem may refer to:

 Krem (instrument), a musical instrument
 Krem (Dragon Age), a fictional character
 KREM (TV), a television station (channel 20 digital/2 virtual) licensed to Spokane, Washington, United States
 Krem Radio, a radio station in Belize
 Krem Television, a cable television station in Belize
 Krem, a Ferengi pirate in Star Trek: Enterprise
 KTTO, a radio station in Spokane, Washington, that originally had the call letters KREM